The Khakas Autonomous Oblast (Khakas: Хакас автоном облазы), abbreviated as Khakas AO (Khakas: Хакас АО) or KhAO (Khakas: ХАО), was part of the 1934 created Krasnoyarsk Krai within the Russian SFSR, Soviet Union. 

Until 1991, Khakas Autonomous Oblast was administratively subordinated to Krasnoyarsk Krai. In July 1991, it was elevated in status to that of an autonomous Soviet socialist republic, and in February 1992 it became the Republic of Khakassia.

Autonomous oblasts of the Soviet Union
1930 establishments in the Soviet Union
1991 disestablishments in the Soviet Union
History of Khakassia